Leif Nilsson may refer to:

 Leif Nilsson (footballer) (born 1963), Swedish footballer
 Leif Nilsson (weightlifter) (born 1952), Swedish Olympic weightlifter